Alexis Tsipras (born 28 July 1974) is a Greek politician serving as Leader of the Official Opposition since 2019. He served as Prime Minister of Greece from 2015 to 2019.

Tsipras has led the Coalition of the Radical Left, known as Syriza, a left-wing political party, since 2009. He was the fourth Prime Minister who governed in the course of the 2010s government-debt crisis.

In January 2015, Tsipras led Syriza to victory in a snap legislative election, winning 149 out of 300 seats in the parliament and forming a coalition with Independent Greeks, a right-wing nationalist party. On 20 August 2015, seven months into his term as prime minister, he lost his majority after intraparty defections; he then announced his resignation and called for a snap election to take place the following month. In the September 2015 election that followed, Tsipras led Syriza to another victory, this time winning 145 out of 300 seats and re-forming the coalition with the Independent Greeks. During his premiership, he oversaw negotiations regarding the Greek government-debt crisis, initiated the Greek bailout referendum and responded to the European migrant crisis. In 2015, he was named by Time magazine as one of the 100 most influential people globally.

Early life and career
Alexios (Alexis) Tsipras was born 28 July 1974 in Athens. His father, Pavlos, was from Athamania in Epirus and was a well-off public works contractor, while his mother, Aristi, was born in Eleftheroupoli, a town in Greek Macedonia. His maternal grandparents were from the village of Babaeski, Eastern Thrace, Turkey and moved to Eleftheroupoli as a result of the 1923 population exchange between Greece and Turkey.

Tsipras joined the Communist Youth of Greece in the late 1980s. In the early 1990s, as a student at Ampelokipoi Multi-disciplinary High School, he was politically active in the student uprising and the school occupations against the controversial law of Education Minister Vasilis Kontogiannopoulos. He rose to prominence as a representative of the student movement when he was featured as a guest on a television show hosted by journalist Anna Panagiotarea. During the interview, Panagiotarea implied that Tsipras was being disingenuous in defending middle and high school students' right to absenteeism without parental notification in the context of protests. Newspapers and opposition politicians contrasted his early activism for the free state education to his choice to enroll his children in private schools when he became prime-minister.

Tsipras studied civil engineering at the National Technical University of Athens, graduating in 2000, before undertaking postgraduate studies in Urban and Regional Planning following an inter-departmental MPhil at the School of Architecture of NTUA. Alongside his postgraduate studies, he began working as a civil engineer in the construction industry. He wrote three studies and projects on the theme of the city of Athens.

As a university student, Tsipras joined the ranks of the renascent left-wing movement, particularly the "Enceladus" group, and as member of it, he was elected to the executive board of the students' union of the Civil Engineering School of NTUA and also served as student representative on the University Senate. From 1995 to 1997 he was an elected member of the Central Council of the National Students Union of Greece (EFEE).

Political career, 1999–2015

After the departure of the Communist Party of Greece from Synaspismos in 1991, Tsipras remained in the coalition. In May 1999 he became the first political secretary of Synaspismos youth-wing, the Synaspismos Youth. During this period he was described as a centrist, different from the very clear radical, left-wing profile he would later maintain as leader of Synaspismos. He won many awards during this time. In November 2003, he was succeeded by Tasos Koronakis and moved on to the mother party. He managed quite efficiently to maintain a strong adherence to the policy of the party, effectively out talking both the left and right political wings. As secretary of Synaspismos Youth, he took an active part in the process of creating the Greek Social Forum and attended many of the international protests and marches against neoliberal globalization. In December 2004, at the 4th Congress of Synaspismos, he was elected a member of the party's Central Political Committee and consequently to the Political Secretariat, where he was responsible for educational and youth issues.

Tsipras first entered the limelight of mainstream Greek politics during the 2006 local election when he ran for Mayor of Athens under the "Anoikhti Poli" (Greek: Ανοιχτή Πόλη, "Open City") Syriza ticket that gained 10.51% of the Athenian vote, finishing third overall. Tsipras won a seat on the Municipality of Athens council by virtue of him being first on the Syriza list. He did not run for the Greek Parliament in the 2007 election, choosing to continue the completion his term as a member of the municipal council of Athens.

Tsipras was elected Leader of Synaspismos during its 5th Congress on 10 February 2008, after its previous Leader Alekos Alavanos decided not to stand for election again due to personal reasons. Tsipras became leader of Synaspismos at the age of 33, thus becoming the youngest leader of a Greek political party since 1931. In the 2009 election, he was elected to the Hellenic Parliament for Athens A and was subsequently voted unanimously to be the head of the Syriza parliamentary group. Tsipras led SYRIZA through the 2012 elections, overseeing a swing of over 22% to the party and becoming the Leader of the Opposition and head of the Shadow Cabinet of Alexis Tsipras.

In December 2013, Tsipras was the first candidate proposed for the position of president of the Commission of the European Union by the European United Left–Nordic Green Left (GUE/NGL). The vote was an EU member states election to the European Parliament in May 2014.

Tsipras campaigned as the only candidate of the south periphery countries. At the beginning of May 2014, in a speech in Berlin, he clarified many of his positions, in opposition to the allegedly Merkel-dominated neoliberal political course in Europe. Tsipras declared a substantial change for a better future for all Europeans is visible within 10 years. He addressed those who lost out in the fallout of the financial crises from 2008 to 2014, which produced unexpectedly high jobless rates in most of the EU. The speech was given in English to a German audience and intended to be listened to throughout Europe. Although the GUE/NGL won in Greece, winning six of the 21 Greek seats in the European Parliament, it finished fifth in Europe overall.

Prime Minister

First term (January–August 2015)

Tsipras led Syriza to victory in the general election held on 25 January 2015, falling short of an outright majority in Parliament by just two seats. The following morning, Tsipras reached an agreement with the right-wing populist Independent Greeks party to form a coalition.

On the same day he was sworn in by President Karolos Papoulias as the youngest Prime Minister in Greek history since 1865, using the words "I declare in my name, honour and conscience to uphold the Constitution and its laws." Tsipras was also the first prime minister to take a civil oath rather than a religious oath of office, marking a rupture with Greek orthodox ceremonial culture. While reaffirming the good relations between his party and the Church, he generated further religious controversy during a meeting with Archbishop Ieronymos. Tsipras explained that as an atheist who neither married in a religious ceremony nor baptised his children, he would not take a religious oath of office.

In his first act after being sworn in, Tsipras visited the Resistance Memorial in Kaisariani, laying down red roses to commemorate the 200 members of the Greek Resistance executed by the German Wehrmacht on 1 May 1944.

During the first meeting of the new cabinet, Tsipras declared the priorities of his government to be the fight against the "humanitarian crisis" in Greece, negotiations with the EU and the International Monetary Fund on restructuring the Greek debt, and the implementation of promises made by SYRIZA such as the abolition of the previous government's privatization policies.

On 3 February, Tsipras made his first official state visit, meeting with his Italian counterpart Matteo Renzi in Rome. They held a joint press conference expressing concerns about austerity measures imposed by the Juncker Commission and stated that economic growth is the only way to exit from the crisis. After the press conference, Renzi presented Tsipras with an Italian tie as a gift. Tsipras, who is notable for never wearing ties, thanked Renzi and said that he would wear the gift in celebration when Greece had successfully renegotiated the austerity measures.

On 20 February, the Eurogroup came to an agreement with Greece to extend the Greek bailout for four months. Tsipras had also announced a trip to Moscow on 8 April, in a bid to secure Russian support.

On 31 May, Tsipras laid out his complaints and outlined his plan in a recap of events since his election. He concluded that there were at least two competing visions for the integration of Europe, both of which he seemed to reject, and that certain unnamed institutional actors had "an obsession" with their own technocratic programme.

On 22 June, Tsipras presented a new Greek proposal, which included raising the retirement age gradually to 67 and curbing early retirement. It also offered to reform the value-added-tax system to set the main rate at 23 percent. On 29 June Greek banks stayed shut and Tsipras said they would remain so to impose capital control. Trading in Greek stocks and bonds halted as well.

Bailout referendum

On 27 June 2015, Tsipras announced a referendum to decide whether or not Greece should accept the bailout conditions proposed jointly by the Juncker Commission, the International Monetary Fund and the European Central Bank.

Tsipras recommended a "No" vote. On 3 July, during an address to at least 250,000 people gathered in the capital's Syntagma Square in front of parliament, he rejected some leaders' warnings that a "No" result in Sunday's plebiscite could see Greece forced to leave the eurozone. He declared "On Sunday, we are not simply deciding to remain in Europe—we are deciding to live with dignity in Europe". The result of the referendum was 61.3% voting "No."

Bailout agreement
After several days of negotiation, on 13 July 2015, Tsipras came to an agreement with lenders. Greece was to get a loan of 82 to 86 billion euros, which would be handed to Greece gradually from 2015 until June 2018. In return, Greece would have to increase the VAT, reform the pension system, assure the independence of ELSTAT, automatically cut public spending to get primary surpluses, reform justice so decisions can be made faster, follow the reforms proposed by OECD, revoke the laws passed by Tsipras except for the one concerning the "humanitarian crisis", recapitalize the banks, privatize 50 billion of state assets, and decrease the cost of the public sector. In return, Greece would be given the Juncker package, 35 billion euros, which is meant to help the Greek economy grow. The Syriza-led government of Greece accepted a bailout package that contains larger pension cuts and tax increases than the one rejected by Greek voters in the referendum.

On 14 August, the Greek parliament backed the country's new bailout deal, although more than 40 MPs from Syriza voted against the deal and Tsipras had to rely on the support of the pro-EU opposition: New Democracy, To Potami and PASOK. Tsipras told MPs they were facing a choice between "staying alive or suicide". He also said: "I have my conscience clear that it is the best we could achieve under the current balance of power in Europe, under conditions of economic and financial asphyxiation imposed upon us."

Resignation
On 20 August 2015, Tsipras resigned from position of the Prime Minister of Greece due to the rebellion of MPs from his own party Syriza and called for a snap election. He made the announcement in a televised state address. After opposition parties failed to form a government, Vassiliki Thanou-Christophilou was appointed as an interim prime minister until elections could be held.

Second term (September 2015 – July 2019)

Re-election
Despite a low turnout of only 57% versus 64% in previous elections, at the 20 September election, Tsipras received a solid vote of confidence, with Syriza achieving 35.50% of the vote, enough to form a coalition with ANEL. Among others, Tsipras appointed in his new government Dimitris Kammenos, a politician from ANEL, as deputy minister for infrastructure, transport and networks, causing reactions because of Kammenos' anti-Semitic, racist and homophobic comments on Twitter, such as accusations of 9/11 being a 'Jewish' plot. The outcry against him eventually forced Kammenos to resign, being a minister for less than 12 hours.

Second government
In September 2015, Defense Minister Panos Kammenos celebrated the Greek victory in the battle of Salamina, causing criticism due to the junta's celebrations of similar events with the same style. In 2015, Tsipras and Kammenos oversaw the military exercise Parmenion.

In October 2015, Tsipras sacked Greece's top tax collection official, Katerina Savvaidou, because she had allegedly granted an extension to television stations to pay a 20% tax on advertising. The government's fiscal measures prompted some backlash, with farmers threatening to bring their tractors into Athens and pharmacists going on strike. In November 2015, Tsipras received an angry reception at a refugee camp in Lesbos by around a hundred protesters, wearing life jackets and brandishing placards calling on the European Union to stop deaths by allowing asylum seekers safe and legal passage to Europe.

In November 2015, Tsipras became the first Greek prime minister to visit Turkey's Aegean province of Izmir since the days of the Occupation of Smyrna, meeting Prime Minister Ahmet Davutoğlu; they agreed to cooperate on the refugee crisis and to establish technical cooperation between Greek and Turkish coast guards.

In December 2015, he introduced the Cohabitation agreement for the same sex-couples.The bill was approved by the Greek Parliament on 23 December 2015. in May 2018, a law allows adoption for same-sex couples.

On 19 March 2016, Tsipras spoke at a conference of the Alliance Against Austerity for Democracy in Europe held in Athens. In his speech, he expressed concern over the possibility of Donald Trump becoming US President. He said as follows: "Tell me who of you would believe a few months ago that in the US today, the front-runner on behalf of the Republicans for the nomination of the candidate President would be Mr. Trump? And of course what this nomination marks, the ideas it represents, the appeal it reaches, and the threat to become even President – I hope we will not face this evil."

In May 2016, new austerity measures proposed by Tsipras passed Parliament. The legislation increased taxes to middle- and high-level income earners; make across-the-board budget cuts amounting to about 3% of Greece's GDP; removed value-added-tax discounts; cut pensions; and increase deregulation. Tsipras called for calm on the streets and defended the austerity package, saying it fell in line with the agreement reached with the EU the previous year. Further austerity legislation included a provision for "contingency" measures, including wage and pension cuts, that would take effect automatically if budget targets were derailed next year. Taxes on cigarettes, coffee and craft beer were also raised, while an unpopular property tax was restructured to increase revenues from larger buildings. A new privatisation agency was set up which would have a 99-year remit to develop and sell state-owned property. Tsipras defended his adoption of new fiscal measures, telling Parliament: "Spring may be almost over but we are looking forward to an economic spring and a return to growth this year." In December 2016, a social reform aimed at the poorest pensioners caused the suspension of Greek debt relief measures by the European Union.

The economic policy of his government, often described as aligned with the directives of the European Commission, earned him strong opposition from the left. Thus, the Communist Party of Greece (KKE) is in opposition and some of the militants of Syriza leave the party to create the Unity. On the other hand, those close to the government believe that it had to face "the obstruction of state institutions and the oligarchy" and that "a left-wing government cannot succeed alone, especially if its country is small and on the verge of bankruptcy". For their part, senior European officials acknowledge that "this government will, more than any other, be scrutinized when it regains its autonomy."

In a July 2017, Tsipras opined that the Greek economy was "on the up" and that "the worst is clearly behind us." He also expressed confidence that Greece will no longer have to rely on bailouts and international oversight in 2018. According to media reports from mid-July, Greece was considering rejoining the bond market for the first time since 2014 to borrow from the capital market. It was speculated that the government could issue a five-year bond at a time when yields on Greek bonds are their lowest since the country left the market in 2014. The announcement came a few days after the IMF "in principle" approved Greece for a conditional loan of up to $1.8 billion. The IMF made the payment of the loans contingent on Greece's debt sustainability, demanding that euro-zone countries provide debt relief to the country.

In October 2017 Prime Minister Tsipras met with President Donald Trump at the White House in Washington, D.C., at which Trump told Tsipras that he supported a "responsible debt relief' plan for Greece as they recovered from the economic crisis in the country. Trump added that his administration had informed Congress of a potential sale to upgrade the F-16 aircraft in Greece's air force, a deal that could be worth $2.4 billion.

Greece officially concluded its three-year European Stability Mechanism (ESM) financial assistance programme on 20 August 2018, following the disbursement of €61.9 billion by the ESM over three years to support the country's macroeconomic adjustment and bank recapitalization. ESM Members agreed on the financial assistance package in August 2015. "The conclusion of the ESM programme marks a very important moment and historic for all of us. We had eight very difficult years, often painful years, but now Greece can finally turn a page in a crisis that has lasted too long," according to EU Commissioner for Economic and Financial Affairs Pierre Moscovici. A day after Moscovici's statement, Prime Minister Alexis Tsipras said during a state address from the island of Ithaca: "A new day is dawning in our country, today is the beginning of a new era". Tsipras furthermore asserted that the country had regained its sovereignty to determine its own future, reaching a destination that would allow the Greeks "to make our place as it deserves to be."

In January 2019, Greece Defence Minister Panos Kammenos and his Independent Greeks party quit Greece's ruling coalition over a deal struck on the Macedonia naming dispute, potentially leaving the governing coalition without a workable majority in parliament. Despite this, some days later, Tsipras managed to win a confidence vote and gain again the support of the absolute majority of the Greek parliament (151 votes) for his government (this time backed by one political party, i.e. SYRIZA). The confidence vote was followed by the successful ratification of the Greek parliament with 153 votes of the Prespa Agreement, an agreement which resolved a long-standing dispute and named Greece's northern neighbour as North Macedonia.

Along with the austerity measures, Alexis Tsipras had promised a "parallel programm" with social reforms in order to achieve a balance between the agreement with Europe and the fight against poverty and neo-liberalism. Some of the main reforms were raise of the minimum wage, introduction of a minimum income scheme, raise of the budget for healthcare and education etc.

Syriza suffered a harsh defeat in the European election on 26 May 2019, losing to the opposition party New Democracy. Following the defeat, snap elections were called.

Syriza was defeated in the 2019 legislative election, scoring 31.53% of votes and securing 86 seats in the Hellenic Parliament. Tsipras conceded defeat and resigned the following day.

His first non-official biography has been written by Fabien Perrier. and by Topos in Greece.

Personal life
Tsipras is not married. His registered partner is Peristera "Betty" Baziana, an electrical and computer engineer. They met in 1987, at the age of 13, at Ampelokipoi Branch High School. Both eventually became members of the Communist Youth of Greece. They live together in Athens with their two sons. Their younger son's middle name is Ernesto, a tribute to the Marxist revolutionary Ernesto "Che" Guevara. Tsipras is an avid football fan and, having grown up near the stadium, supports Panathinaikos, attending every home game that he can. Tsipras is a self-described atheist. His cousin, Giorgos Tsipras, is also a Syriza MP.

See also
Politics of Greece
List of international prime ministerial trips made by Alexis Tsipras

References

External links

Homepage of Alexis Tsipras, 2014 candidature for European Commission President
Curriculum Vitae Synaspismos website
Ανοιχτή Πόλη
Tsipras MP profile on Vouliwatch.gr

|-

|-

|-

|-

|-

 
1974 births
Living people
20th-century atheists
21st-century atheists
21st-century prime ministers of Greece
Chairpersons of Synaspismos
Communist Party of Greece politicians
Foreign ministers of Greece
Greek atheists
Greek engineers
Greek government-debt crisis
Greek Marxists
Greek MPs 2009–2012
Greek MPs 2012 (May)
Greek MPs 2012–2014
Greek MPs 2015 (February–August)
Greek MPs 2015–2019
Greek socialists
National Technical University of Athens alumni
Politicians from Athens
Prime Ministers of Greece
Syriza politicians
Greek MPs 2019–2023